Clay Township is an inactive township in Gasconade County, in the U.S. state of Missouri.

Clay Township has the name of Henry Clay, a politician from Kentucky.

References

Townships in Missouri
Townships in Gasconade County, Missouri